The following is a list of episodes of the television series Gary Unmarried, which originally ran on CBS from September 24, 2008, to March 17, 2010.

A total of 37 episodes of Gary Unmarried have been produced over two seasons.

Series overview
{| class="wikitable plainrowheaders" style="text-align:center"
|-
! style="padding: 0 8px;" colspan="2" rowspan="2" |Season
! style="padding: 0 8px;" rowspan="2"| Episodes
! colspan="2"| Originally aired
|-
! First aired
! Last aired
|-
| style="background-color: #0000FF" |
| [[List of Gary Unmarried episodes#Season 1 (2008–09)|1]]
| 20
| 
| 
|-
| style="background-color: #A90000" |
| [[List of Gary Unmarried episodes#Season 2 (2009–10)|2]]
| 17
| 
| 
|}

Episodes

Season 1 (2008–09)

Season 2 (2009–10)

References

Lists of American sitcom episodes